Hyphessobrycon cachimbensis is a species of South American tetra, belonging to the family Characidae.

Description 
Hyphessobrycon cachimbensis has little to no markings excluding a small black spot at the base of the caudal fin. The belly of the tetra is beige in coloration, whereas the back of the fish is a darker brown color. The areas in between are golden colored. They are known to grow up to around 5 centimeters (2 inches).

The species name, cachimbensis, is derived from the Cachimbo River, a waterway in which it resides.

Distribution 
Hyphessobrycon cachimbensis is known to live in the Tapajós River Basin in central Brazil. This fish is benthopelagic, meaning that it resides away from the surface of the water (suggesting that it consumes both benthic and free floating food sources).

References 
- Distribution

- Hyphessobrycon cachimbensis Travassos, 1964

- Hyphessobrycon cachimbensis

Characidae
Taxa named by Harogldo Pereira Travassos
Fish described in 1964